Jill Bennett may refer to:

 Jill Bennett (British actress) (1931–1990)
 Jill Bennett (American actress) (born 1975)
 Jill Bennett, character in Knots Landing